Mikkel is a Danish and Norwegian masculine given name. It may refer to:

Mikkel Ødelien (1893–1984), Norwegian soil researcher
Mikkel Aaland (born 1952), award-winning American photographer
Mikkel Andersen (disambiguation)
Mikkel Bødker (born 1989), Danish ice hockey right winger
Mikkel Beck (born 1973), Danish former football player
Mikkel Beckmann (born 1983), Danish professional football winger
Mikkel Birkegaard, Danish author of fantasy fiction
Mikkel Bischoff (born 1982), Danish professional footballer of Kenyan descent
Mikkel Borch-Jacobsen (born 1951), Professor of Comparative Literature and French at the University of Washington in Seattle
Mikkel Christoffersen (born 1983), Danish professional association football player
Mikkel Diskerud (born 1990), Norwegian-born American association football midfielder
Mikkel Frandsen (1892–1981), Danish American physical chemist
Mikkel Frost (born 1971), Danish architect
Mikkel Hansen (born 1987), Danish handballer
Mikkel Hindhede (1862–1945), Danish physician and nutritionist
Mikkel Jensen (footballer born 1977) (born 1977), Danish football (soccer) player in the central midfielder position
Mikkel Johannesen Borge (born 1791), Norwegian politician
Mikkel Kessler (born 1979), Danish professional boxer and currently WBC Super Middleweight champion
Mikkel Mikkelsen, Fiscal and Governor-General ad interim of St. Thomas in the Danish West Indies, from 27 February 1686 to 29 June 1686
Mikkel Parlo (born 1990), Danish mixed martial artist
Mikkel Poulsen (born 1984), internationally elite curler from Denmark
Mikkel Rønnow (born 1974), Musical Director, Musical Theatre Performance Coach and Theatrical Producer
Mikkel Rask (born 1983), Danish professional football (soccer) player
Mikkel Thygesen (born 1984), Danish professional footballer
Mikkel Vendelbo (born 1987), Danish professional football midfielder
Mikkel Warming (born 1969), the mayor of the social area in Copenhagen since 2005
Tor Mikkel Wara (born 1964), former Norwegian politician

See also
Michael
Mikkel Museum, art museum in Tallinn, Estonia

Danish masculine given names